Baza is a rural locality (a settlement) in Yayvinskoye Urban Settlement, Alexandrovsky District, Perm Krai, Russia. The population was 7 as of 2010.

Geography 
It is located 14 km north from Yayva.

References 

Rural localities in Alexandrovsky District